Safdar Ali Abbasi ( born 26 December 1957) is a Pakistani politician and physician. He is a former senator and the leader of the Pakistan Peoples Party Workers (PPP-W).

Early life
Abbasi was born in Larkana, Pakistan, on 26 December 1957. His family had long been involved in politics. Abbasi's mother, Ashraf Abbasi, was at one time the Deputy Speaker of the National Assembly of Pakistan. Abbasi attended Aitchison College, Lahore, completing Cambridge and Intermediate studies before pursuing a medical degree at Dow Medical College, Karachi. He was interested and involved in local politics during his youth.

Political career 

In 2018, Abbasi along with some other PPP leaders announced his own faction named as Pakistan Peoples Party Workers and later became its president.

Controversies

Benazir Bhutto's  Assassination Case 
Safdar Abbasi and his wife, Naheed Khan, faced many problems after Benazir Bhutto's assassination on December 27, 2007, in Liaquat Bagh. Both were considered close to Benazir Bhutto and sidelined under the new leadership of Asif Ali Zardari, along with her other close advisers.

Since Benazir Bhutto's death, many of the party workers who were close to her lost their positions in the Zardari government, including party worker and leader of the lawyers movement in Pakistan Aitezaz Ahsan. Instead, many new figures were introduced to fill these positions.

References 

1957 births
Living people
Pakistan People's Party politicians
Members of the Senate of Pakistan
People from Larkana District
Sindhi people
Aitchison College alumni
Dow Medical College alumni
20th-century Pakistani physicians